Bojnord Airport  is an airport serving Bojnord (also spelled Bojnourd or Bojnurd), the capital city of the North Khorasan province in Iran.

Facilities
Bojnord Airport has ILS (Instrument landing system).

Airlines and destinations

References

External links
 
 

Airports in Iran
Transportation in North Khorasan Province
Buildings and structures in North Khorasan Province